Aldin Adžović (born 18 June 1994) is a Montenegrin football midfielder, playing for FK Jezero.

International career
In May 2016, while playing with Borac Čačak, he was part of Montenegro "B" team.

References

External links
 
 Aldin Adžović stats at utakmica.rs
 
 

1994 births
Living people
People from Tuzi
Association football midfielders
Montenegrin footballers
Montenegro under-21 international footballers
FK Dečić players
OFK Titograd players
FK Borac Čačak players
FK Zeta players
KF Ballkani players
FK Iskra Danilovgrad players
Montenegrin Second League players
Montenegrin First League players
Serbian SuperLiga players
Football Superleague of Kosovo players
Montenegrin expatriate footballers
Expatriate footballers in Serbia
Montenegrin expatriate sportspeople in Serbia
Expatriate footballers in Kosovo
Montenegrin expatriate sportspeople in Kosovo